Christania Williams (born 17 October 1994) is a Jamaican female sprinter.

She competed at the 2016 Summer Olympics in Rio de Janeiro, in the women's 100 metres.

References

External links
 World Athletics

1994 births
Living people
Jamaican female sprinters
Olympic athletes of Jamaica
Athletes (track and field) at the 2016 Summer Olympics
Olympic silver medalists for Jamaica
Olympic silver medalists in athletics (track and field)
Medalists at the 2016 Summer Olympics
World Athletics Championships athletes for Jamaica
World Athletics Championships medalists
Commonwealth Games medallists in athletics
Commonwealth Games silver medallists for Jamaica
Athletes (track and field) at the 2018 Commonwealth Games
People from Saint Ann Parish
Olympic female sprinters
21st-century Jamaican women
Medallists at the 2018 Commonwealth Games